Gary Mauer is an American theatre actor who most recently starred in the third national tour of The Phantom of the Opera playing the role of the Phantom. On Broadway, Gary starred as Raoul, Vicomte de Chagny in Phantom and played the role of Enjolras in Les Misérables. He has also appeared in numerous regional shows, including playing Jesus in Jesus Christ Superstar.  From April 30, 2007 through May 19, 2007, Gary filled in for Howard McGillin, the actor who formerly played The Phantom in Phantom, on Broadway. Gary has a B.F.A in Musical Theater from the University of Arizona in Tucson, and currently resides in New Jersey with his wife, actress Elizabeth Southard, and his two children: Nicholas and Eden. He can be heard on several CDs, including Bravo Broadway and Broadway's Fabulous Phantoms. In 2007, he recorded his own album, This Is the Moment, which includes "The Music of the Night", from The Phantom of the Opera, and "Bring Him Home", from Les Misérables. Gary is a lyric tenor who can currently be seen as part of the Bravo Broadway series in concerts throughout the United States with various symphonies.

External links

Official Site

American male stage actors
University of Arizona alumni
Living people
Year of birth missing (living people)